Lothar Fuchs (born 18 June 1941) is a German former ice hockey player who competed for ASK Vorwärts Crimmitschau. He played for the East Germany national ice hockey team at the 1968 Winter Olympics in Grenoble.

References

1941 births
Living people
German ice hockey forwards
Ice hockey players at the 1968 Winter Olympics
Olympic ice hockey players of East Germany
People from Gotha (district)
Sportspeople from Thuringia